Farak (also Romanized as Fark and Fork) is a village in Rudbar Rural District, in the Central District of Tafresh County, Markazi Province, Iran. At the 2006 census, its population was 312, in 118 families.

References 

Populated places in Tafresh County